Emick is a German language surname, a variant of Emig. Notable people with the name include:

Buzz Emick (1939-2014), American attorney
Jarrod Emick (born  1969), an American actor

See also

Emich, lists other variants of the name

References

German-language surnames